The Representation of the People Act 1989 (c. 28) is an act by the Parliament of the United Kingdom.

It extended the time that a British citizen could have lived abroad and still vote from 5 years to 20 years, and extended this right to people who were too young to vote at the time of leaving Britain.

See also

 Reform Acts
 Representation of the People Act

Representation of the People Act 1969
Representation of the People Act 1985

References

External links

United Kingdom Acts of Parliament 1989
Representation of the People Acts
1989 in law